Andromache is a figure from Greek mythology, the wife of Hector.
Andromache may also refer to:

Mythology
Andromache, queen of the Amazons
Andromache, one of the would-be sacrificial victims of Minotaur

Literary works
Andromache (play), by Euripides
Andromaque, a play by Jean Racine

Other uses
175 Andromache, an asteroid
HMS Andromache, the name of four ships of the British Royal Navy, and one planned one
Andromache, Queensland, a locality in Australia
Andromache (singer), Greek singer, representative of Cyprus in the Eurovision Song Contest 2022
Mount Andromache, Alberta, Canada

See also
Andromeda (disambiguation)